The five teams in this group played against each other on a home-and-away basis. The group winner Spain qualified for the 17th FIFA World Cup held in South Korea and Japan. The runner-up Austria advanced to the UEFA Play-off and played against Turkey. Spain dominated the group, with six wins out of eight, and only two away draws (against second-placed Austria and third-placed Israel) to mar the record. Second place, however, was not decided until the last minute of the last match: Austria had a three-point advantage, but Israel led 1-0 which would have brought them level in the group standings, and had a superior goal difference which would have seen them into second place, but Austria scored an injury-time equalizer to earn a draw and retain their second position.

Standings

Results

The game was originally scheduled for 7 October 2001. On 4 October FIFA announced postponement of the match for safety reasons after a plane departed from Tel Aviv crashed in the Black Sea.

Goalscorers

4 goals

 Andi Herzog
 Raúl

3 goals

 Michael Baur
 Elvir Baljić
 Sergej Barbarez
 Fernando Hierro
 Gaizka Mendieta

2 goals

 Thomas Flögel
 Haim Revivo
 Gerard López
 Fernando Morientes
 Diego Tristán

1 goal

 Eduard Glieder
 Bruno Akrapović
 Mirsad Bešlija
 Marijo Dodik
 Almedin Hota
 Muhamed Konjić
 Nermin Šabić
 Yossi Abuksis
 Pini Balili
 Eyal Berkovich
 Shimon Gershon
 Yaniv Katan
 Alon Mizrahi
 Avi Nimni
 Idan Tal
 Rubén Baraja
 Joseba Etxeberria
 Iván Helguera
 Javi Moreno
 Miguel Ángel Nadal

1 own goal

 Michael Baur (playing against Israel)

References

External links
FIFA official page
RSSSF - 2002 World Cup Qualification
Allworldcup

7
2000–01 in Israeli football
2001–02 in Israeli football
2000–01 in Bosnia and Herzegovina football
2001–02 in Bosnia and Herzegovina football
2000–01 in Spanish football
Qual
2001–02 in Austrian football
2000–01 in Austrian football
2000–01 in Liechtenstein football
2001–02 in Liechtenstein football